The  is a DC electric multiple unit (EMU) train type operated by the Nagano Electric Railway in Japan on Snow Monkey limited express services since 26 February 2011, replacing the remaining ageing 2000 series trains.

The two 3-car sets were converted from former 253 series 3-car EMU sets Ne107 and Ne108, purchased from JR East in 2010 following their withdrawal from Narita Express services. They underwent modifications for wanman ("one man") driver only operation at Tokyu Car's Yokohama factory before being moved to the Nagano Electric Railway in December 2010 for final repainting.

Formations
The two sets are formed as follows.

Car 2 is fitted with one lozenge-type pantograph.

Exterior
The trains were initially finished in the same livery of white, red, grey, and black, which they carried in the JR days. From September 2012, set E2 was repainted into a new livery of red and white without the grey and black bands of the original livery.

Interior

Cars 2 and 3 retain the original seating arrangement with fixed unidirectional non-reclining seating, 2+2 abreast, facing a centre pair of 4-seat bays. The original toilets are retained, but are locked out of use.

History

 3 June 2010: Nagano Electric Railway announces that it has purchased two 3-car 253 series EMU sets from JR East.
 22 July 2010: Former 253 series sets Ne107 and Ne108 are moved from JR East's Nagano Works to Tokyu Car's Yokohama factory via Zushi Station.
 19 November 2010: Nagano Electric Railway announces that the new trains will be named Snow Monkey.
 24 December 2010: The two sets are moved from Tokyu Car to Nagano following modifications.
 18 February 2011: The new trains are shown off to the press on a preview ride between Shinshū-Nakano and Suzaka.
 20 February 2011: A preview ride on the new trains is offered between Nagano and Shinshū-Nakano.
 26 February 2011: The new trains enter revenue service.

On 8 September 2012, set E2 was returned to service following general overhaul repainted into a new livery of red and white.

References

External links

 Nagano Electric Railway "Snow Monkey" information site 

Rail transport in Nagano Prefecture
Electric multiple units of Japan
Train-related introductions in 2011
1500 V DC multiple units of Japan